Alexandre Gilles (born 29 May 1884, date of death unknown) was a French racing cyclist. He rode in the 1920 Tour de France.

References

1884 births
Year of death missing
French male cyclists
Place of birth missing